Tony Ensor (born 11 May 1991) is a New Zealand rugby union player who plays either as a fullback or wing for Stade Français in the Top 14. He previously played for Otago in the National Provincial Championship.  He scored 6 tries in 11 matches during the 2012 ITM Cup and that form saw him named in the Wider Training Squad for the 2013 Super Rugby season.

In October 2014 he was named in the New Zealand Sevens side to play in the opening tournament of the HSBC World Sevens Series on the Gold Coast, Australia.

References

External links
 Toby Ensor itsrugby.co.uk Player Statistics

1991 births
Living people
Highlanders (rugby union) players
New Zealand rugby union players
Otago rugby union players
People educated at South Otago High School
Rugby union fullbacks
Rugby union players from Balclutha, New Zealand